Nurly Jol is a $9 billion domestic economic stimulus plan by Kazakhstan's President Nursultan Nazarbayev.

Nurly Jol may also refer to:

 Astana Nurly Jol, the main railway station in Astana, the capital of Kazakhstan.